List of state highways in Georgia may refer to:

 List of state routes in Georgia (U.S. state)
 List of special state routes in Georgia (U.S. state)
 Transport in Georgia (country)#Highways